The 1966 Penn State Nittany Lions football team represented Penn State University during the 1966 NCAA University Division football season. It was Joe Paterno's first season as head coach of Penn State.

Schedule

Game summaries

Maryland

Michigan State

Army

Boston College

UCLA

West Virginia

Roster

NFL/AFL Common Draft
Three Nittany Lions were drafted in the 1967 NFL/AFL Common Draft.

References

Penn State
Penn State Nittany Lions football seasons
Penn State Nittany Lions football